The New Brunswick Liquor Corporation, operating as Alcool NB Liquor (ANBL), is the provincial Crown corporation of the Canadian province of New Brunswick responsible for the purchase, importation, distribution, and retail activity for all beverage alcohol in the Province. Alcool NB Liquor (ANBL) is directed by a seven-member Board of Directors. Decisions and directions from the Board are guided by section 6(3) of the New Brunswick Liquor Corporation Act:

"The Board shall administer the affairs of the Corporation on a commercial basis and all decisions and actions of the Board are to be based on sound business practices".

The Corporation contributes in excess of $164 million directly to the general fund of the Provincial Government. This consists of over $2.2 million in collections for the Environmental Trust Fund, and over $289,000 in real property taxes.

The central office and warehouse complex is located in Fredericton. ANBL services the public and licensees through a network of 41 corporate retail outlets and 85 private agency store outlets. ANBL's product portfolio comprises over 2,200 products, including wines, spirits, beers and other products, such as coolers and ready to drink beverages.

ANBL's purchasing by-law follows the spirit and intent of the Public Purchasing Act. Additionally, construction contracts are awarded and administered consistent with the Crown Construction Contracts Act.

References

External links

Canadian provincial alcohol departments and agencies
Alcohol in New Brunswick
Alcohol monopolies
Crown corporations of New Brunswick
Government agencies established in 1976
Companies based in Fredericton
Alcohol distribution retailers of Canada
1976 establishments in New Brunswick